Reed Prinsep (born 17 February 1993) is a New Zealand rugby union player who currently plays as a loose forward for  in New Zealand's domestic Mitre 10 Cup and for the  in the international Super Rugby competition.

Early career

Born and raised in Canterbury, Prinsep attended and played rugby at the famous Christchurch Boys' High School before going on to study law and commerce at the University of Canterbury.   During this time he was involved with both Canterbury and the Crusaders youth structures, being named as Canterbury Colts player of the year in 2014 and also being a member of the Crusaders Academy and the Crusaders Knights development side.

Senior career

Prinsep was a member of Canterbury's wider training group in 2014 and made 2 appearances before gaining a full contract in 2015.   He played 11 times that season to help Canterbury regain their Premiership title and went onto make a further 11 appearances the following season as Canterbury were crowned champions for an 8th time in 9 seasons. In the 2020 season, Prinsep became captain of the Canterbury team.

Super Rugby

Excellent form for Canterbury meant that it was a surprise that he was unable to earn a Super Rugby contract in 2016.

Subsequent excellent performances for Canterbury during the 2016 Mitre 10 Cup saw him signed up on a 2-year deal by defending Super Rugby champions, the  ahead of the 2017 Super Rugby season.

International

Prinsep was named in the Māori All Blacks squad for their northern hemisphere tour in November 2016.   He debuted in the number 6 jersey in a 27–14 defeat to Munster on 11 November 2016, playing the full 80 minutes with the exception of a 10-minute spell in the sin-bin for a yellow card offence in the 30th minute.   One week later he played the second half as a replacement for Shane Christie as the Māori overcame Harlequins by a score of 26–10.

Career honours

Canterbury

National Provincial Championship – 2015, 2016

References

1993 births
Living people
New Zealand rugby union players
Rugby union flankers
Canterbury rugby union players
Crusaders (rugby union) players
Rugby union players from Christchurch
People educated at Christchurch Boys' High School
Te Rarawa people
Hurricanes (rugby union) players
Māori All Blacks players